The raising of Jairus' daughter is a reported miracle of Jesus that occurs in the synoptic Gospels, where it is interwoven with the account of the healing of a bleeding woman. The narratives can be found in Mark 5:21–43, Matthew 9:18–26 and Luke 8:40–56.

Summary 
Scholars have long recognised the Lukan and Matthean accounts of the story derive from the Markan account and are a typical example of a Synoptic triple tradition. It has no equivalent in the Gospel of John. Although some have drawn comparisons with the Healing the royal official's son (John 4) and Raising of Lazarus (John 11) narratives, Zwiep (2015) stated that 'they are entirely different and unrelated stories, according to most biblical scholars to date.'

Premise 
The differences between the three Gospel narratives are well known amongst scholars. The premise of the story in Mark and Luke is that a ruler (Mark: εἷς τῶν ἀρχισυναγώγων "one of the synagogue rulers"; Luke: ἄρχων τῆς συναγωγῆς "a ruler of a synagogue") of a Galilean synagogue called Jairus (Iaeiros, from the Hebrew name Yair) wants Jesus to 'heal/save' (Mark: σωθῇ) his 12-year-old daughter who was 'dying' (Luke: ἀπέθνῃσκεν) or 'holding at (the point of) the end' (Mark: ἐσχάτως ἔχει; often translated as 'at the point of death'). In Matthew, the synagogue ruler is unnamed, the girl's age is not mentioned, she has already 'just died' (ἄρτι ἐτελεύτησεν), and the father's request is that Jesus lay his hand upon her 'and she will live [again]' (Matthew: καὶ ζήσεται). In other words, in Matthew he requests Jesus to reverse her death rather than prevent it, as in Mark and Luke.

Setting 
The timing and setting differs somewhat between the Gospels. In Mark and Luke, the story immediately follows the exorcism at Gerasa; Jairus comes up to Jesus as soon as he disembarks from his boat. In Matthew chapter 9, it is first preceded by three other events (Healing the paralytic, Calling of Matthew, New Wine into Old Wineskins). There, Jesus is at Matthew the Apostle's house associating with tax collectors and sinners, while debating Pharisees and disciples of John the Baptist, when the synagogue ruler arrives.

Mark and Luke report a large crowd (ὄχλος) following Jesus around and pressing against him (συνέθλιβον/συνέπνιγον αὐτόν) as he followed Jairus to his house. Matthew makes no such mention; it is only Jesus and his disciples (μαθηταὶ) following the synagogue ruler.

The bleeding woman 

The narrative about Jairus' daughter is interrupted by the appearance of a woman who had a haemorrhage (Matthew: αἱμορροοῦσα haimorroousa "having had a flow of blood"; Mark/Luke: οὖσα ἐν ῥύσει αἵματος ousa en rhysei haimatos "being with a flow of blood") for 12 years. Mark and Luke inform the reader that all this time nobody could heal her, with Mark dramatically adding 'she had spent all she had on physicians to no avail' (Mark 5:25–26; Luke 8:43). When she touched Jesus' cloak, her bleeding stopped immediately according to Mark and Luke. In Matthew, she was not healed until after Jesus had told her: "Take courage, daughter, your faith healed you." Matthew's story of the bleeding woman also concludes there (Matthew 9:20–22).

In Mark and Luke, the woman's act of touching his cloak appears to disturb Jesus, who seems agitated or even angry (given the mention that the woman φοβηθεῖσα καὶ τρέμουσα 'trembled in fear' at his reaction), as he feels (Mark) or says (Luke) that 'power had gone out of him/me'. Jesus asks around the crowd 'Who touched me/my clothes?' Luke claims that all those in the crowd denied they did it, and has Peter say that crowds are pressing against Jesus (Mark only reports the latter, from the mouths of 'the disciples'). Unsatisfied, Jesus keeps inspecting the crowd until the now-healed woman, trembling in fear, falls at Jesus' feet and admits that it was her. Jesus answers: 'Daughter, your faith has healed you. Go in peace (and be freed from your suffering)', concluding the Markan and Lukan bleeding woman accounts (Mark 5:25–34, Luke 8:43–48).

Daughter reported dead 
In Mark's and Luke's narrative, '[people] come' (Mark: ἔρχονται, plural) or 'someone comes' (Luke: ἔρχεταί	τις, singular) with the news that Jairus' daughter had died, and Jairus is advised not to trouble Jesus any further. However, Jesus responds: "Don’t be afraid; just believe", with Luke extending the quote with "and she will be healed/saved" (σωθήσεται). When arriving at Jairus' house, Jesus does not let anyone follow him inside 'except Peter, James and John, the brother of James', with Luke adding 'and the father of the child and the mother', later also added by Mark (Mark 5:35–37,40; Luke 8:49–50).

In Matthew's account, the daughter was already dead from the start, so this event does not happen. Moreover, Matthew's Jesus 'allows no bystanders to witness Jesus performing the resurrection miracle (Mt. 9.25)'.

Jesus raises daughter 
At Jairus' house, Mark and Luke report that Jesus "saw a commotion, with people crying and wailing loudly" (Mark 5:38; Luke 8:52 NIV); according to Matthew, he "saw the noisy crowd and people playing pipes" (Matthew 9:23 NIV). He informed all those present that the girl was not dead but asleep; in Matthew, Jesus even tells the crowd to 'Go away'. But the crowd laughed at Jesus. Mark says Jesus put the crowd outside; Matthew confirms this happens without mentioning who does it; Luke doesn't report it, but instead emphasises that the crowd 'knew she had died'.

Jesus then went back inside (Mark, Matthew). He took the girl by the hand, and she got up. In Mark's account, the Aramaic phrase "Talitha koum" (transliterated into Greek as ταλιθα κουμ and reportedly meaning, "Little girl, I say to you, get up!") is attributed to Jesus (Mark 5:41 NIV). Luke's Jesus says "My child, get up!"; Matthew's Jesus is silent. The accounts in Mark and Luke end with Jesus' commands that the girl should be fed and that Jairus and his wife should tell no-one what had happened. On the other hand, Matthew concludes the narrative by saying: 'News of this spread through all that region.'

Narrative comparison 
The following comparison table is primarily based on the New International Version (NIV) English translation of the New Testament.

Interpretations

Significance of 12 years 
The combined stories have been used as an example of intercalation ("sandwich story"), where one incident is inserted within another, linked in this case by the connection between the 12-year ailment and the 12-year-old girl. 12 years also represents the age at which girls come of age in Judaism, and so it appears that Mark and Luke mention the girl's age to emphasise the tragedy of her dying before her father could marry her off, receive a dowry and expect grandchildren to continue his lineage. Mary Ann Getty-Sullivan (2001): 'Thus the father may have faced financial loss as well as social disgrace, in addition to the personal sorrow of his daughter's illness and death.'

Status of women 
Other links established by Getty-Sullivan include the fact that Jesus calls the bleeding woman 'daughter' while he's on the way to Jairus' daughter; the apparent inferior status of both females as the girl's father represents her (and she is not given her own name, but rather the 'daughter of'), and the woman dares not face Jesus directly to ask for healing, but secretly approaches him from behind to touch his clothes; and the fact that both the woman and girl are rendered ritually unclean by their afflictions, and yet Jesus miraculously heals them by touching them.

According to Barbara E. Reid (1996), it is significant that Luke adds that it is the father's only daughter, and that the Raising of the son of the widow of Nain narrative (only told in Luke's gospel, 7:11–17) mirrors it exactly by stating that he was the mother's only son. Seeing that the genders are reversed here, but nevertheless treated in the same way, Reid concluded that daughters and sons were treated as equals by Luke's Jesus, in contrast to that society's culture, which valued sons far above daughters.

Role of faith 
John Donahue and Daniel Harrington (2015) state that this episode shows that "faith, especially as embodied by the bleeding woman, can exist in seemingly hopeless situations". Michael Keene (2002) states that there is a link between Jairus and the woman: "The link between them is faith since both Jairus and the bleeding woman showed great faith in Jesus". John Walvoord and Roy Zuck (1983) state that: "What appeared to be a disastrous delay in the healing of the woman actually assured the restoration of Jairus' daughter. It was providentially ordered to test and strengthen Jairus' faith." Johann Lange (1960) also states that: "This delay would serve both to try and to strengthen the faith of Jairus."

Description of the raising 
William Robertson Nicoll (1897) suggested that the instruction to feed the girl is placed "in a more prominent position" in Luke than in Mark "to show that as she had been really dead, she was now really alive and well; needing food and able to take it". Frédéric Louis Godet remarks "on the calmness with which Jesus gave the order after such a stupendous event": "As simply as a physician feels the pulse of a patient He regulates her diet for the day". Getty-Sullivan (2001) pointed out that, rather than Mark/Luke's verb ἀνίστημι ("to stand up, to get up"), Matthew used the verb ἐγείρω ("to (a)rise") that is commonly connected to the resurrection of Jesus, suggesting that Matthew wanted to cast Jesus' miraculous revival of Jairus' daughter as a foreshadowing of what would later happen to Jesus himself.

See also

 Life of Jesus in the New Testament
 Luke 8
 Ministry of Jesus
 Parables of Jesus
 Talitha (given name)

References

Notes

Citations

Sources

 
 

 
 
 
 

Miracles of Jesus
Resurrection